Eduardo Peruchena (born 29 October 1964 in Buenos Aires, Argentina) is the coach of the Argentina women's national handball team and a former handball player.

After growing up in Lujan, Buenos Aires, Argentina, he developed a career related to handball. He played for 10 years in his hometown team and coached some other small teams, while as a day job he teaches physical education for Colegio Tarbut. He was the first coach to reach an Olympic stage with the female national team in the year 2016. Many experts said that his accomplishments and progress has been unique for Argentina's sports.

In the year 2012 a survey was posted on an internet page, after several days of voting between 4 candidates running up for coach, Peruchena got on top and weeks later he was announced as the manager of the Female team.

Accomplishments

 Campeonato Panamericano 2017, subcampeón.
 Río de Janeiro 2016, 12 ° puesto (primera participación olímpica).
 Juegos Panamericanos Toronto 2015, subcampeón.
 Campeonato Panamericano Cuba 2015, tercer puesto.
 Campeonato mundial 2015, 18 ° lugar.
 Campeonato mundial 2013,19 ° lugar.

References

Living people
1964 births
Argentine handball coaches
Sportspeople from Buenos Aires